Palasport Mens Sana is an indoor sporting arena located in Via Sclavo, Siena, Italy. The seating capacity of the arena is for 6,000 people. Opened in 1976, it is currently home to the Mens Sana Basket professional basketball team.

It was one of the host arenas of the EuroBasket 1979. 

In 2020, LED lightings are being installed to be modern, adequate and energy savings. Also, the central scoreboard is being  dismantled as well.

See also
 List of indoor arenas in Italy

References

External links
Euroleague.net Image of the Arena

Indoor arenas in Italy
Basketball venues in Italy